Tracy Redies is a Canadian politician, who was elected to the Legislative Assembly of British Columbia in the 2017 provincial election. She represents the electoral district of Surrey-White Rock as a member of the British Columbia Liberal Party caucus.

Prior to her election to the legislature, Redies was chief executive officer of Coast Capital Savings and, before that, Executive Vice President and Head of Personal Financial Services, the personal banking and wealth management operations of, HSBC Bank Canada.

On July 29, 2020, Redies announced she would be resigning her seat that August 31 to become the new CEO of Science World.

Electoral record

References

British Columbia Liberal Party MLAs
Living people
People from Surrey, British Columbia
Women MLAs in British Columbia
Year of birth missing (living people)